Anastasius was abbot of Euthymius in Palestine, around 741 CE. He wrote in Greek a work against the Jews, a Latin version of which by Turrianus is printed in the Antiquae Lectiones of Henricus Canisius. The translation is very imperfect. A manuscript of the original work is still extant.

Notes

8th-century writers
8th-century Christian clergy